ARTS FIRST is an annual arts festival held at Harvard University over four days each May. It includes performances or shows involving musical, theatrical, and artistic groups on campus.  It was founded by alum John Lithgow in 1994 to honor the artistic community at Harvard, and is run by Harvard's Office for the Arts (OFA). The festival is a public event and many of the events are free.

Participation
All Harvard affiliates (undergraduates, graduate students, faculty, staff, and alumni/ae) may apply to perform and exhibit artwork during ARTS FIRST. Performing ensembles may include non-Harvard affiliates, as long as at least one performer is a Harvard affiliate.

The festival involves up to 2,000 artists, giving over 100 performances and exhibitions. 

Volunteers are recruited to assist in running the festival. They are not required to be Harvard alumni.

Participant funding
Some funding is provided for selected Public Art projects in Harvard Yard. ARTS FIRST Performance Fair performances are directly given a free venue, publicity, and production support, instead of funding.

Performances
The Performance Fair includes opera, dance, music of many genres, stand-up and improv comedy, theater, poetry and experimental performances.

Public art
The festival includes exhibitions of public art in Harvard Yard and other locations around the campus. Works include sculpture, installations, or installations with performance/video components and film/video. 

Student projects that are selected for exhibition in Harvard Yard receive supporting guidance from a professional visual artist.

Harvard Arts Medal
The Harvard Arts Medal is an annual award established in 1995 to recognize: "excellence and demonstrated achievement in the arts by a Harvard or Radcliffe alumnus/a or faculty member." The medal is given to an individual who has achieved distinction in the arts and who has made a special contribution to the good of the arts, to the public good in relation to the arts, or to education. It is awarded on the recommendation of a committee of (Harvard) faculty, alumni and administrators, by the Office of Governing Boards and the President of Harvard. 

During a 2012 interview discussing his part in initiating the Harvard ARTS FIRST annual festival, John Lithgow said: "In 1995, I proposed the Harvard Arts Medal. The idea was to celebrate the fact that, although it’s rare, Harvard men and women do go into the creative arts." 

The recipient of the annual Harvard Arts Medal is announced during the course of the festival.

Recipients

References

External links 
 2019 Festival Schedule

Harvard University
Music festivals in Massachusetts
Film festivals in Massachusetts
Theatre festivals in the United States
Art festivals in the United States